Trinity Towers is an historic structure located in the  Columbia Heights neighborhood in the  Northwest Quadrant of Washington, D.C.  Harvey Warwick designed the structure in the Gothic Moderne style. It was completed in 1928 along the 14th Street streetcar line.  The building was listed on the National Register of Historic Places in 2001.

References

Residential buildings completed in 1928
Apartment buildings in Washington, D.C.
Residential buildings on the National Register of Historic Places in Washington, D.C.